Ionuţ Dimofte (born 30 September 1984, in Suceava) is a Romanian rugby union footballer. He plays for the Romanian team, Baia Mare. He also plays for the București Wolves in the European Challenge Cup.

Dimofte played all the four games for his country at the 2007 Rugby World Cup, scoring a conversion and two penalties in the narrow 18-24 defeat against Italy. He also played at the 2011 Rugby World Cup.

Notes

1984 births
Living people
Romanian rugby union players
Rugby union fly-halves
Sportspeople from Suceava
Romania international rugby union players